The 2021–22 season is the 111st season in the existence of FK Austria Wien and the club's 73rd consecutive season in the top flight of Austrian football. In addition to the domestic league, Austria Wien are participating in this season's editions of the Austrian Cup and the UEFA Europa Conference League.

Players

First-team squad

Other players under contract

Transfers

Pre-season and friendlies

Competitions

Overall record

Austrian Football Bundesliga

Regular stage

Results summary

Results by round

Matches
The league fixtures were announced on 22 June 2021.

Championship round

Matches

Austrian Cup

UEFA Europa Conference League

Second qualifying round
The draw for the second qualifying round was held on 16 June 2021, 13:30 CEST.

References

FK Austria Wien seasons
Austria Wien
2021–22 UEFA Europa Conference League participants seasons